Peter Roe may refer to:

Peter Roe (soccer) (born 1955), Canadian soccer player
Peter Roe (rugby league), English rugby league player and coach
Peter Roe, owner of Dublin's now defunct Thomas Street Distillery